Mangaung (Bloemfontein metropolitan area) like most South African metropolitan areas, uses Metropolitan or "M" routes for important intra-city routes, a layer below National (N) roads and Regional (R) roads. Each city's M roads are independently numbered.

Bloemfontein's N and R roads are as follows: The N1, a major highway running roughly SW to NE from Cape Town to Johannesburg and Zimbabwe largely bypasses this city to the west. The N8 runs east/west connecting Bloemfontein to Kimberley and Maseru, the capital of Lesotho. Bloemfontein is also the northern end of the N6 road heading roughly southwards to the port of East London. At a T-junction just before the city, the N6 becomes the M30, and the intersecting road is designated the N6. This road ends in an interchange with the N1.

There are also two two-digit R routes: the R64, which is the old road to Kimberley, via Dealesville and Boshof. It ends at the N1. The R30 ends at the N1 north of the town. It is the road to Welkom. 

Three other three-digit R routes have their origin in Bloemfontein. The R706 takes origin from the N8 in the city centre, and heads south-east towards Jagersfontein and Fauresmith. The R702 also originates from the N8 in the city centre, but heads south-west towards the towns of Dewetsdorp and Wepener. The third road, the R700, starts south of the city centre from the M30 and heads north crossing the N8 and N1 towards Bultfontein.

Table of M roads

See Also  
 Numbered Routes in South Africa

References 

Roads in South Africa